Rhyothemis is a genus of dragonfly in the family Libellulidae. 
They are commonly known as flutterers.

Rhyothemis species are found in Africa, Asia, Australia and the Pacific region. The flight of the genus Rhyothemis is usually fluttering, leading to the common description of "flutterer" for most species in the genus.

Species
The genus Rhyothemis includes the following species:

References

Libellulidae
Anisoptera genera
Odonata of Oceania
Odonata of Africa
Odonata of Asia
Odonata of Australia
Taxa named by Hermann August Hagen
Taxonomy articles created by Polbot